Hockley County is a county located in the U.S. state of Texas. As of the 2020 census, its population was 21,537. Its county seat is Levelland. The county was created in 1876, but not organized until 1921. It is named for George Washington Hockley, a secretary of war of the Republic of Texas.

Hockley County comprises the Levelland Micropolitan Statistical Area, which is included in the Lubbock–Levelland Combined Statistical Area.

History
Hockley County was formed in 1876 from portions of Bexar and Young Counties. It was named for George Washington Hockley, the commander of artillery in the Battle of San Jacinto and later Secretary of War of the Republic of Texas.

Geography

Major highways
   U.S. Highway 62/U.S. Highway 82
  U.S. Highway 84
  U.S. Highway 385
  State Highway 114

Adjacent counties
 Lamb County (north)
 Lubbock County (east)
 Terry County (south)
 Cochran County (west)
 Yoakum County (southwest)
 Bailey County (northwest)
 Hale County (northeast)
 Lynn County (southeast)

Demographics

Note: the US Census treats Hispanic/Latino as an ethnic category. This table excludes Latinos from the racial categories and assigns them to a separate category. Hispanics/Latinos can be of any race.

As of the census of 2000, 22,716 people, 7,994 households, and 6,091 families resided in the county.  The population density was 25 people per square mile (10/km2).  The 9,148 housing units averaged 10 per square mile (4/km2).  The racial makeup of the county was 74.38% White, 3.72% Black or African American, 0.82% Native American, 0.13% Asian, 0.04% Pacific Islander, 18.68% from other races, and 2.22% from two or more races.  About 37.24% of the population was Hispanic or Latino of any race.

Of the 7,994 households, 38.10% had children under the age of 18 living with them, 60.40% were married couples living together, 11.50% had a female householder with no husband present, and 23.80% were not families, and 21.20% of all households were made up of individuals, and 10.00% had someone living alone who was 65 years of age or older.  The average household size was 2.77 and the average family size was 3.22.

In the county, the population was distributed as 29.10% under the age of 18, 11.80% from 18 to 24, 25.90% from 25 to 44, 20.60% from 45 to 64, and 12.60% who were 65 years of age or older.  The median age was 33 years. For every 100 females, there were 96.30 males.  For every 100 females age 18 and over, there were 92.20 males.

The median income for a household in the county was $31,085, and for a family was $35,288. Males had a median income of $29,735 versus $20,671 for females. The per capita income for the county was $15,022.  About 14.80% of families and 18.90% of the population were below the poverty line, including 24.10% of those under age 18 and 12.60% of those age 65 or over.

Communities

Cities
 Anton
 Levelland (county seat)
 Ropesville

Towns
 Opdyke West
 Smyer
 Sundown

Unincorporated communities
 Pep
 Roundup
 Whitharral

Politics

Education
School districts serving the county include:
 Anton Independent School District
 Frenship Independent School District
 Levelland Independent School District
 Ropes Independent School District
 Smyer Independent School District
 Sundown Independent School District
 Whiteface Consolidated Independent School District
 Whitharral Independent School District

The county is in the service area of South Plains College.

See also

 Llano Estacado
 South Plains College
 U.S. Route 84
 West Texas
 Yellow House Draw
 Recorded Texas Historic Landmarks in Hockley County

References

External links

 
 Hockley County Profile from the Texas Association of Counties
 Public domain images of the Llano Estacado

 
1921 establishments in Texas
Populated places established in 1921
Majority-minority counties in Texas